LeRoy Allen See (alternative first name spelling Le Roy) ( – 19 June 1922) was an American amateur speed skater and cyclist active during the first decade of the 20th century.

See held the world's amateur skating record for the 220 yard dash (set in 1900) for over a decade before it was broken by Edmund Lamy.

See died on June 19, 1922 at St. Bartholomew's Hospital in New York City following an operation.

References

Notes

1922 deaths
People from New York City
Sportspeople from New York City
American male speed skaters